Constantin Bivol (born 10 March 1885 in Costeşti, Chișinău County; died 12 March 1942, Gulag, penitentiary No. 4, in Chistopol, TASSR) was a Bessarabian politician. Farmer. He completed the questionnaire being on age of 33 years. On 27 March 1918 he voted for the unification of Bessarabia with Romania.

Biography 

He served as Member of the Moldovan Parliament (1917–1918).

Gallery

Bibliography 
Gheorghe E. Cojocaru, Sfatul Țării: itinerar, Civitas, Chişinău, 1998, 
Mihai Taşcă, Sfatul Țării şi actualele autorităţi locale, "Timpul de dimineaţă", no. 114 (849), June 27, 2008 (page 16)
Alexandru Chiriac. Membrii Sfatului Ţării. 1917–1918. Dicţionar, Editura Fundaţiei Culturale Române, București, 2001.

External links 
 Arhiva pentru Sfatul Tarii
 Deputaţii Sfatului Ţării şi Lavrenti Beria

Notes

1885 births
1942 deaths
People from Ialoveni District
People from Kishinyovsky Uyezd
Moldovan MPs 1917–1918
Romanian people of Moldovan descent
Prisoners who died in Soviet detention